Élodie Woock (born 13 January 1976) is a French former football midfielder. She played for Toulouse FC in the French First Division and 1.FFC Frankfurt in the German Bundesliga, and was a member of the French national team for most of her career, taking part in the 1997 and 2001 European Championships and the 2003 World Cup.

Now a manager, she currently coaches ES Saint-Simon in the French Third Division.

Titles
 4 French Leagues (1999, 2000, 2001, 2002)
 1 French Cup (2002)
 1 German League (2003)
 1 German Cup (2003)

References

External links
 
 

1976 births
Living people
French women's footballers
France women's international footballers
Toulouse FC (women) players
2003 FIFA Women's World Cup players
Expatriate women's footballers in Germany
People from Mont-Saint-Aignan
Women's association football midfielders
French expatriate sportspeople in Germany
Sportspeople from Seine-Maritime
Footballers from Normandy
French expatriate women's footballers